James Thorpe (born August 17, 1915, in Aiken, South Carolina, died January 4, 2009, in Bloomfield, Connecticut) was the director of the Huntington Library, and a professor of English at Princeton University. He was the author of a biography of the library namesake, Henry Edwards Huntington.

He was awarded Guggenheim Fellowships in 1949 and 1965. In 1976, he was elected to the American Academy of Arts and Sciences. He was later elected to the American Philosophical Society in 1982.

He received a BA from The Citadel and a PhD from Harvard University.

References

1915 births
2009 deaths
American academics of English literature
Princeton University faculty
People from Aiken, South Carolina
People from Bloomfield, Connecticut
People associated with the Huntington Library

Members of the American Philosophical Society
The Citadel, The Military College of South Carolina alumni
Harvard University alumni